Vaccinium reticulatum, known as  in Hawaiian, is a species of flowering plant in the heather family, Ericaceae, that is endemic to Hawaii. Adaptations to volcanic activity include the ability to survive ash falls of over  depth.

Description

Fruit
The fruit is an edible berry  diameter, ranging in color from blue to purple to red to orange to yellow. The color does not necessarily indicate the ripeness of the berries. The berries taste somewhat similar to the related cranberries, less ripe ones being tart, while ripe berries are quite sweet but bland. They are an important food source for the nēnē (Branta sandvicensis); the seeds are dispersed in the birds' droppings (endozoochory).

Uses
Oligomeric proanthocyanidins (OPC) can be obtained by the means of V. pahalae in vitro cell culture.

See also
Hawaiian Vaccinium

References

 Plants of Hawaii Volcanoes National Park: Vaccinium reticulatum

External links

 
 
 

Alpine flora
Endemic flora of Hawaii
reticulatum
Flora without expected TNC conservation status